Paul-Mohamed Kalambay Otepa (born 12 November 1948) is a Congolese football goalkeeper who played for Zaire in the 1974 FIFA World Cup. He also played for TP Mazembe.

References

External links

1948 births
Democratic Republic of the Congo footballers
Democratic Republic of the Congo international footballers
Association football goalkeepers
TP Mazembe players
1974 FIFA World Cup players
Living people
21st-century Democratic Republic of the Congo people